Untamed is a 2020 memoir by Glennon Doyle. It was published by The Dial Press on March 10, 2020. It is her third memoir following her works Love Warrior and Carry on, Warrior.

The book debuted at number one on The New York Times nonfiction best-seller list. where it stayed for seven weeks. As of May 31, 2020, the book has spent 10 weeks on the list.

A television adaptation is in the works at Bad Robot Productions and Warner Bros. Television Studios.

Reception
Publishers Weekly wrote, "This testament to female empowerment and self-love, with an endearing coming-out story at the center, will delight readers."

Kirkus Reviews called it a "lucid, inspiring chronicle of female empowerment and the rewards of self-awareness and renewal."

References

2020 non-fiction books
American memoirs
Dial Press books
LGBT autobiographies
LGBT literature in the United States